may refer to:

People 
 Shirakawa (surname)
 Emperor Shirakawa, an eleventh-century emperor of Japan

Places 
 Shirakawa, Fukushima, a city in Fukushima Prefecture, Japan
 Shirakawa Domain, a feudal domain of Edo-period Japan
 Shirakawa, Gifu (town), a town in Gifu Prefecture, Japan
 Shirakawa, Gifu (village), a World Heritage site in Gifu Prefecture, Japan
 Shirakawa, a neighborhood of Koto, Tokyo
 Shirakawa, Miyagi, a town in Miyagi Prefecture, Japan
 Shirakawa, Saitama, a town in Saitama Prefecture, Japan
 Shirakawa River, a river in Kyoto
 Shirakawa River (Kumamoto), a river in Kumamoto